The Forest City Border Crossing connects the towns of Forest City, Maine and Forest City, New Brunswick on the Canada–US border. At this crossing, Canada is still operating the original border station built in 1931.  The US built a new border station in 2013, replacing a building that was built in 1964.  The original plans called for a much larger facility, but the design was scaled back at the request of local residents. Open from 8am to 4pm, in 2015, fewer than seven cars a day used the crossing.

See also
 List of Canada–United States border crossings

References

Canada–United States border crossings
1929 establishments in Maine
1929 establishments in New Brunswick
Transportation in Washington County, Maine
Buildings and structures in Washington County, Maine
York County, New Brunswick